Terry Wayne Adams (born March 6, 1973), is an American former professional baseball pitcher, who played in Major League Baseball (MLB) from  to  for the Chicago Cubs, Los Angeles Dodgers, Philadelphia Phillies, Toronto Blue Jays, and Boston Red Sox.

Amateur career

High school
At Mary G. Montgomery High School, he went 12–2 with a 1.75 ERA his senior season and was the 1991 Alabama High School Player of the Year.

Professional career

Draft and Minor Leagues
He was selected by the Chicago Cubs in the 4th round of the  baseball draft and began his professional career by recording a 0–9 record in 13 starts with the Huntington Cubs in the rookie league. He rose through the Cubs farm system with stops in Peoria, Daytona, Orlando and Iowa.

Chicago Cubs (1995–1999)
Adams made his Major League debut on August 10, 1995, for the Cubs against the San Diego Padres in the first game of a doubleheader at Wrigley Field. Adams pitched a scoreless two-thirds of an inning in relief of starting pitcher Frank Castillo. Adams returned to the mound in the second game of the doubleheader, pitching a scoreless eighth inning in relief of starting pitcher Steve Trachsel.

Los Angeles Dodgers (2000–2001)
After the 1999 season, the Cubs traded Adams to the Los Angeles Dodgers (along with two minor leaguers Chad Ricketts and Brian Stephenson) in return for Eric Young and Ismael Valdes.

He was suspended for three games after an altercation with fans on May 25. In , Adams spent part of the season in the bullpen and part of the season in the Dodgers starting rotation. It was the first time he had started regularly since pitching with the Single-A Daytona Cubs of the Florida State League. Adams went 12–8 with a 4.33 ERA in 43 games, 22 of which were starts, for the Dodgers that season. Adams was the pitcher to give up Barry Bonds' 500th home run on April 17, 2001.

Philadelphia Phillies (2002–2003)
Adams signed as a free agent with the Philadelphia Phillies for the  season as a starting pitcher before ultimately being returned full-time to the bullpen. In 46 appearances, 19 of which were starts, he posted a 7–9 record with a 4.35 ERA in 2002.

He re-signed with the Phillies prior to the  season and enjoyed one of his finest seasons, posting a 1–4 record with a 2.65 ERA in 66 relief appearances.

Toronto Blue Jays (2004)
Adams signed with the Toronto Blue Jays on January 7, and was a key contributor to their bullpen. He appeared in 42 games, posting a 4–4 record with three saves and a 3.98 ERA before being traded to the Boston Red Sox shortly before baseball's trade deadline.

Boston Red Sox (2004)
On July 24, 2004, Adams was traded to the Boston Red Sox for third baseman John Hattig. The move was one of several attempts by the Red Sox front office to bolster the Boston bullpen for the pennant push. Adams did not perform well down the stretch for the Red Sox, going 2–0 with a 6.00 ERA in 19 appearances. He was included on the postseason roster although he did not appear in any games en route to the club's first World Series championship since .

Second stint with the Philadelphia Phillies (2005)
A free agent after the 2004 season, Adams once again signed with the Philadelphia Phillies on January 11, . He struggled drastically in 16 appearances out of the bullpen, going 0–2 with a 12.83 ERA, walking 10 batters in 13 innings.

On May 23, in what would prove to be his final big league appearance, Adams yielded one run on two hits with a strikeout in one-third of an inning of work for the Phillies in a 5–2 loss to the Florida Marlins. He was released the following day.

Pittsburgh Pirates organization (2006)
Adams made 48 relief appearances for Indianapolis and posted a 4.29 ERA.

After baseball
Adams worked as an assistant coach at his alma mater, Mary G. Montgomery High School.

References

External links

Terry Adams at SABR (Baseball BioProject)

1973 births
American expatriate baseball players in Canada
Living people
Major League Baseball pitchers
Baseball players from Alabama
Sportspeople from Mobile, Alabama
Chicago Cubs players
Los Angeles Dodgers players
Philadelphia Phillies players
Toronto Blue Jays players
Boston Red Sox players
Huntington Cubs players
Peoria Chiefs players
Daytona Cubs players
Iowa Cubs players
Orlando Cubs players
West Tennessee Diamond Jaxx players
Scranton/Wilkes-Barre Red Barons players
Indianapolis Indians players